Mohrezi (also Romanized as Moḩrezī and Mohrezī; also known as Mowrezī) is a village in Angali Rural District, in the Central District of Bushehr County, Bushehr Province, Iran. At the 2006 census, its population was 165, in 39 families.

References 

Populated places in Bushehr County